Lokoua Taufahema (born 27 June 1973) is a Tongan former footballer who played as a midfielder for Tonga Major League club Lotoha'apai United and the Tonga national team. He represented Tonga in the 2014 FIFA World Cup qualifiers. In 2001, he scored three goals in a 2002 FIFA World Cup qualification (OFC) match against American Samoa.

In 2013 he was appointed assistant coach of the Tonga U17 national team.

In December 2014 he killed his wife by pouring boiling oil on her face. In November 2015 he was acquitted of murder, but pleaded guilty to manslaughter. In January 2016 he was sentenced to 15 years imprisonment for the crime, with three years suspended.

Career statistics
Scores and results list Tonga's goal tally first, score column indicates score after each Taufahema goal.

References

External links
 

Living people
1969 births
Tongan footballers
Tonga international footballers
Association football midfielders
Lotohaʻapai United players